Goodenia macmillanii, commonly known as pinnate goodenia, is a species of flowering plant in the family Goodeniaceae and is endemic to Victoria, Australia. It is an erect, short-lived perennial shrub with lyrate or lobed leaves, egg-shaped to elliptic in outline with toothed edges, and leafy racemes of bluish-purple flowers.

Description

Taxonomy
Goodenia macmillanii was first formally described by Victorian Government Botanist  Ferdinand von Mueller in 1859 in Fragmenta Phytographiae Australiae, from specimens collected near the "McAllister River". The specific epithet (macmillanii) honours Gippsland pioneer and explorer Angus McMillan.

Distribution and habitat
Pinnate goodenia grows on rocky slopes in the valleys of the Macalister, Snowy and Deddick Rivers.

Conservation status
The species is listed as  "vulnerable" on the Department of Sustainability and Environment's Advisory List of Rare Or Threatened Plants In Victoria.

Use in horticulture
The species may be grown in shade or sun, and is somewhat drought tolerant though it performs best in moist situations. It can withstand light to moderate frosts and prefers a sandy loam although it may be grown in rocky or clay-based soils. It may also be grown as a container plant in  standard potting mix. Plants may be propagated by division.

References

macmillanii
Flora of Victoria (Australia)
Asterales of Australia
Taxa named by Ferdinand von Mueller
Plants described in 1859